"Welcome to the Fold" is a song by American rock band Filter, released in August 1999 as the lead single from their second studio album, Title of Record. The song was included on Spins list of "The 69 Best Alternative Rock Songs of 1999."

Background
The title of the song is based on an album of the same name released in 1998 by a novelty folk-rock band from Cleveland called 100,000 Leagues Under My Nutsack. Filter's bassist, Frank Cavanagh, was friends with 100,000 Leagues' lead singer, and Richard Patrick liked the album so much that he named the song after it.

In 1999, singer Richard Patrick said, "'Welcome to the Fold' is based on being a crazed lunatic. That's what being a mid-20's decadent bachelor is all about. Not giving a flying fuck. I got money. I got a platinum record. I got a band. I've got everything I want and I don't give a flying fuck what I do." Patrick also described it as his favorite song on the album, and said "it's a 10-minute song with three songs in it."

While the song's verses are screamed and the guitar riff is grinding and abrasive, the chorus is more sedate and chord-driven. Patrick described the milder chorus as "the party at the end of the night. The weekend. The celebration of just the fact that we're doing OK, we feel OK."

Music video
The song's music video (directed by Peter Christopherson) begins with an RV driving through a desert, and a man comes out spotting a giant clear cube, in which the band is performing the song inside of. A man comes out and calls on his radio and soon more people in RVs come and set up camp to watch the concert. During the guitar solo, several of the campers jump inside the cube and do some crowd surfing. At the end of the video, the cube floats up in the air and explodes.

Track listings
US 12-inch single

US maxi-CD single and UK CD1

UK CD2

Australian maxi-CD single

Personnel
Filter
 Richard Patrick – vocals, guitar, programming
 Geno Lenardo – guitar, programming
 Frank Cavanagh – bass
 Steven Gillis – drums

Additional musicians
 Jim McGrath – percussion

Charts

Release history

References

External links
 Official Music Video on YouTube

1999 singles
1999 songs
Filter (band) songs
Reprise Records singles
Songs written by Richard Patrick
American alternative rock songs